Summer Rains may refer to:

Summer Rains (album), a 2008 album by the Ditty Bops
Operation Summer Rains, a 2006 Israeli military operation

See also
Summer Rain (disambiguation)